Dasht-e Denayik (also Romanized as Dasht-e Denāyīḵ) is a village in Howmeh Rural District, in the Central District of Haftgel County, Khuzestan Province, Iran. At the 2006 census, its population was 186, in 37 families.

References 

Populated places in Haftkel County